Francis Mary Paul Libermann, CsSp (born Jacob Libermann; 14 April 1802 – 2 February 1852) was a French Jewish convert to Catholicism and a Spiritan priest. He is best known for founding the Society of the Holy Heart of Mary, which later merged with the Spiritans. He is often referred to as "The Second Founder of the Spiritans". He was declared venerable in the Catholic Church on 1 June 1876, by Pope Pius IX.

Early life
Jacob Libermann was born into an Orthodox Jewish family in Saverne, Alsace, France in 1802. As a young man, Libermann prepared to follow in the footsteps of his father, the Chief Rabbi of Saverne. 

He would later relate how he lost his faith in Judaism after entering a yeshiva. Treated with disdain by two of the professors there, he began to read French literature, especially Rousseau, with the result that he became an agnostic. Later during this period of agnosticism, another rabbinical student gave him a Hebrew translation of the Gospels. Being always a very moral person, Libermann was captivated by the high moral tone of Jesus' discourses, though he could not accept the supernatural elements in the Gospels. Then, however, his eldest brother first, and afterwards two other brothers, embraced Catholicism. Although Jacob deeply resented their change of religion, he gradually came to recognize their happiness, which was in strong contrast with his own distracted frame of mind.

After arriving in Paris, where his father had sent him to pursue his studies, he made the acquaintance of David Paul Drach, a convert from Judaism, who had him received into the College Stanislas. The knowledge of his conversion was long concealed from his father, who was horrified to learn of his favorite son's actions. When the news of his baptism reached Saverne, his father mourned him as dead.

Jacob Libermann was baptized on 24 December 1826, taking the name François Marie Paul. He entered the Saint-Sulpice seminary in Paris in the same year to study for the priesthood.

Priest and missionary
On the very eve of his ordination to the subdiaconate, he was stricken down by an attack of epilepsy which was to be his companion for the next five years. During that time he was kept by his charitable superiors at the seminary of Issy. It was there that he was brought into close apostolic relationship with two Creole seminarians, M. Le Vavasseur, from Bourbon, and M. Tisserand, from Santo Domingo, both of whom were filled with zeal for the evangelization of the poor ex-slaves of those islands. Libermann suffered from epileptic seizures, which prevented his ordination for nearly fifteen years. It was only when these seizures ceased in 1841 that he was able to become a priest. After his ordination, Libermann created the Congregation of the Immaculate Heart of Mary centered around missionary activity towards newly freed slaves in Réunion, Haiti, and Mauritius.

As this group attracted more members, the Holy See merged his society with the older Congregation of the Holy Spirit, otherwise known as "Spiritans". Due to this event, Libermann is often referred to as the "Second Founder" of the Spiritans.

Although, Fr. Libermann himself never went overseas, he recruited and educated missionaries going to Africa, both lay and clerical. He exhausted himself in the process of leading his great enterprise, and died on 2 February 1852 before his 50th birthday.

Legacy

He was declared venerable by Pope Pius IX in 1876.

His letters, hundreds of which survive, are frequently used as a guide in the devotional life. Fr. Libermann was a pioneer of strategies now recognized as a blueprint for modern missionary activity. He urged the Spiritans to "become one with the people" so that each group received and understood the Gospel in the context of their own traditions.

Francis Libermann Catholic High School in Toronto and Collège Libermann in Douala (Cameroon) are named in his honor.

Gallery

References

Bibliography

External links 
 A newsletter about Fr. Libermann written by the Hebrew Catholic Association.
 The Life of Fr. Libermann as told in articles by the Spiritans.
 The Provisional Rule of the Missionaries of the Holy Heart of Mary, written by Libermann.
 Jesus through Jewish Eyes Volume 1, Commentary on John's Gospel Libermann, a convert from Judaism.
 Jesus through Jewish Eyes Volume 2.
 Jesus through Jewish Eyes Volume 2.

1802 births
1852 deaths
19th-century French Roman Catholic priests
19th-century venerated Christians
Alsatian Jews
Converts to Roman Catholicism from Judaism
Founders of Catholic religious communities
19th-century French Jews
Holy Ghost Fathers
People from Saverne
People with epilepsy
Venerated Catholics